Hypocrisy is the sixth studio album by Swedish melodic death metal band Hypocrisy, released on 22 June 1999. The digipak version of the album includes the bonus track "Self Inflicted Overload". The Japanese release of the album includes three bonus tracks: "Self Inflicted Overload", a demo version of "Elastic Inverted Visions" and "Falling Through the Ground".

Reception 
In 2005, Hypocrisy was ranked number 408 in Rock Hard magazine's book The 500 Greatest Rock & Metal Albums of All Time.

Track listing

Credits 
Hypocrisy
Peter Tägtgren − guitar, vocals, keyboards
Michael Hedlund − bass
Lars Szöke − drums

Charts

References 

Hypocrisy (band) albums
Nuclear Blast albums
1999 albums
Albums produced by Peter Tägtgren